Jamie Glaser (born January 21, 1955 in New York City), is an American guitarist best known for his guitar work on popular television shows like Seinfeld, Saved By The Bell, and  Married... with Children. He has recorded and toured with Bryan Adams, Jean-Luc Ponty, Chick Corea, The Manhattan Transfer, Lenny White, and Gloria Trevi.

The album The Dream was his European solo release in 1989.

Gander Guitars has released a Jamie Glaser signature model.

Gelvin Guitars had released a Jamie Glaser signature model called the JG 2.0, it had been replaced with the JG 3.0.

Glaser was a guest artist on the Isaiah Stewart albums Thrill Ride (2015), and Summer Beat (2018), which featured Randy Brecker, Eumir Deodato, and Tom Scott, with additional engineering and production by Jason Miles.

Currently living in Utah, Glaser is the musical director for the trumpet group the Brunson Brothers.

References

External links
 Jamie Glaser Website

Jazz fusion guitarists
1955 births
Living people
Guitarists from New York City
American male guitarists
20th-century American guitarists
American male jazz musicians
Chick Corea Elektric Band members
20th-century American male musicians